Admiral Sir Gerald Vaughan Gladstone,  (3 October 1901 – 11 July 1978) was a Royal Navy officer who served as Commander-in-Chief, Far East Fleet from 1957 to 1960.

Early Years
Gladstone was educated at the Cathedral School, Llandaff, before joining the Royal Naval College, Osborne, on the Isle of Wight in May 1915.

Naval career
Gladstone joined the Royal Navy in 1915. He served in the First World War aboard .

He was made Assistant Director for Torpedoes and Mining Deputy at the Admiralty in 1942.

He became Vice Controller of the Royal Navy and Director of Naval Equipment in 1952 and second-in-command of the Far East Fleet and Flag Officer Commanding 5th Cruiser Squadron in 1953. He was appointed North Atlantic Treaty Organization Commander, Allied Naval Forces, Northern Europe in 1955 and Commander-in-Chief, Far East Fleet in 1957; he took part in Queensland's Centenary Celebrations in 1959.

Gladstone retired in 1960.

Family
On 16 December 1925 at Brompton Oratory, London, Gladstone married Marjorie Cecilia Mary (Justine) Johnston, daughter of John Goring Johnston of New Zealand. They had two sons and a daughter. Justine died in 1964.

In 1966, Gladstone married Dora Brown, née Stewart, his second wife. He predeceased his second wife, who died in December 2006.

References

1901 births
1978 deaths
Knights Commander of the Order of the Bath
Knights Grand Cross of the Order of the British Empire
Royal Navy admirals
Royal Navy personnel of World War I
Royal Navy personnel of World War II
Johnston family